Pär Arlbrandt (born November 22, 1982) is a Swedish former professional ice hockey forward, who last played for HV71 in the Swedish Hockey League (SHL).

Playing career
Arlbrandt joined Swiss club EHC Biel on a one-year contract on July 23, 2014, after leading the Swedish Hockey League in scoring in the 2013–14 season with 71 points in 53 games for Linköpings HC. He then returned to HV71 in 2016. After winning the SHL title with HV71 in 2017, Arlbrandt announced his retirement as a player.

Career statistics

Awards and honors

References

External links

1982 births
Living people
EHC Biel players
HV71 players
EC KAC players
Linköping HC players
Luleå HF players
Rögle BK players
Södertälje SK players
Swedish ice hockey right wingers
IF Troja/Ljungby players
VIK Västerås HK players
People from Jönköping
Sportspeople from Jönköping County